The 50th Baeksang Arts Awards ceremony, organised by Ilgan Sports, took place on May 27, 2014, at Grand Peace Hall, Kyung Hee University, Seoul, beginning at 6:20 p.m. KST. The ceremony was televised live in South Korea by JTBC and was hosted by Shin Dong-yup and Kim Ah-joong.

The nominations were announced on April 27, 2014, through the official website. The Attorney led the film-related categories with seven nominations and Reply 1994 led the television-related categories with nine nominations. The highest honors of the night, Grand Prize (Daesang), were awarded to actor Song Kang-ho of The Attorney in the film division and actress Jun Ji-hyun of My Love from the Star in the television division. The Attorney and My Love from the Star were the most winning work at the ceremony with three awards each. Kim Soo-hyun was the most awarded individual of the night; he won Best New Actor – Film and Most Popular Actor – Film for Secretly, Greatly and Most Popular Actor – Television for My Love from the Star.

Winners and nominees 
Winners are listed first, highlighted in boldface.
Nominees

Film

Television

Special awards

Performers 
Performers listed in the order of appearance.

Gallery

Notes

References

External links 
  
 

Baeksang
Baeksang
Baeksang Arts Awards
Baek
Baek
2010s in Seoul
2014 in South Korea